Cydoor  is a spyware and adware first detected in 2003.

Cydoor software
The Cydoor software downloads advertisements from the Cydoor servers, to be displayed in the Cydoor-supported software. It is built as a program integrated into the parent application but is not uninstalled along with it. It automatically updates itself and displays advertisements regardless of the speed of the Internet connection of the user. Cydoor consumes about 3.4MB of hard drive space, and cannot be uninstalled using the Windows uninstaller. No uninstaller is provided. Cydoor is often bundled with commercial Peer-to-peer file sharing programs such as Kazaa, iMesh and eXeem. It is also present in download manager applications such as NetAnts and FlashGet. According to Cydoor Desktop Media, the ad technology reaches 70 million unique users worldwide.

Formerly, a user could uninstall Cydoor and continue to use the program installed with it, but that is sometimes no longer the case. Now Cydoor is treated as a vital piece of software code by the parent program, and removal may cause the program to stop working. The website's FAQ explains, "Our components...are the main revenue generating components for our software partners," as the way of explaining their supposed necessity. Programmers have successfully removed Cydoor's software from Kazaa (resulting in Kazaa Lite and Kazaa Resurrection).
   
The program has been known to cause problems in Windows, but the company asserts that this is due to an old and buggy version of the software. The code downloads advertisements to the "infected" system but it does not collect personal information. The company said this is the case unless "the user voluntarily supplied it".

Removal
This software can be removed by most anti-spyware programs, such as Ad-Aware and Spybot - Search & Destroy.

References

External links 
Cydoor article at Adware Report
Dummy replacement DLL for Cydoor

Spyware
Adware